Lough Conway is a very small freshwater lake in northwest Ireland.

Etymology
The origin of the lake name is unknown, but has the meaning "".

Geography
Lough Conway is located in Kiltubbrid parish in the county Leitrim. It connects with Drumaleague Lough by a  navigable stretch of the Shannon–Erne Waterway.

Ecology
Fish present in Lough Conway include Pike. The pike population is the "native Irish strain" ( meaning 'Irish Pike') not the other European Pike strain ( meaning 'strange or foreign fish'). The ecology of Lough Conway, and other county Leitrim waterways, are threatened by zebra mussel and other invasive species.

History

Corn mill
From at least the 18th century a sluice was used to reserve a water supply from Lough Conway for the nearby Corn Mill situated on Kilclaremore townland. This corn mill was "", so  the branch drain between "" and Lough Conway was  improved. The corn mill closed in the 20th century.

Human settlement
The primary human settlements near Lough Conway are the surrounding townlands of Kilclaremore and Drumruekill to the west, Loughconway to the north, and Kilclaremore on the south.

See also
 List of loughs in Ireland
 Drumaleague Lough
 Carrickaport Lough

References and notes

Notes

Citations

Primary references

Secondary references

Miscellaneous

Folklore

Castlefore